Masimbaashe "Masi" Matongo (born 15 May 1996) is a Zimbabwean professional rugby league footballer who plays as a  forward for the Bradford Bulls in the RFL Championship.

Background
Matongo was born in Harare, Zimbabwe.

Career

Hull FC
Matongo made his Hull F.C. début on 11 September 2015 in a Super League Super 8s away match against Wigan Warriors at the DW Stadium.

Bradford Bulls (loan)
In August 2021 he joined Bradford Bulls on loan until the end of the season.

York City Knights
On 22 Oct 2021 it was reported that he had signed for York City Knights in the RFL Championship

International career
In July 2018 he was selected in the England Knights Performance squad.

References

External links
Hull FC profile
SL profile

1996 births
Living people
Bradford Bulls players
Hull F.C. players
Rugby league props
York City Knights players
Zimbabwean rugby league players
Zimbabwean sportspeople